The Maya Mountains frog (Lithobates juliani) is a species of frog in the family Ranidae found in Belize and possibly Guatemala. Its natural habitats are subtropical or tropical moist lowland forests, moist savanna, and rivers. This anuran is found primarily in the Mayan Mountain region between 100m and 915m of elevation.

References

Sources
  (1984). Phylogeny and taxonomy of the Rana palmipes species group (Salientia: Ranidae). Herpetological Monographs 2: 1-26.
  (2005). Phylogeny of the New World true frogs (Rana). Mol. Phylogenet. Evol. 34(2): 299–314.  PDF fulltext. 
  (2007). Constraints in naming parts of the Tree of Life. Mol. Phylogenet. Evol. 42: 331–338.
  (2013). Belizean Pine Forests. Encyclopedia of Earth. National Council for Science and the Environment. ed. M. Mcginley.

Lithobates
Amphibians of Belize
Amphibians described in 1988
Taxonomy articles created by Polbot